Style King is a 2016 Indian Kannada-language action black comedy film directed by PC Shekhar and produced by Maruthi Jediyavar. It stars Ganesh, Remya Nambeesan, making her Kannada debut, and Rangayana Raghu in the lead roles. PC Shekhar had previously worked with Ganesh in the film  Romeo (2012). The film's cinematography was by Santhosh Pandi and the music was composed by Arjun Janya.

The film was officially announced on 12 August 2014 and it was reported that Ganesh would feature in two different roles. The film was expected to release on 25 December 2015 along with actor Yash's film Masterpiece. After multiple delays, the film was censored in April 2016 and finally released on 13 May 2016.

Plot 
Karthik and Kashi are doppelgangers, Kashi aka King is a small time crook, who steals a bag of cocaine from a drug smuggler Dheena and his henchman. He, along with his friend Babu hid the bag in dumping yard. Karthik is an aspiring police trainee, who is in trouble when his father Naga is in debts and had borrowed money from the councilor, but is unable to return the money. So, the councilor took Naga's friend Sundar's Jewellary case and tells it to repay it on time. Sundar learns of this and cancels his younger daughter Ramya's wedding with Karthik. Days pass by, Karthik learns from his constable friend Giri that he passed the IPS exam. but had to pay a bribe of ₹20 lakhs in order to get posting in Bangalore. Meanwhile, Sundar gradually warms up to Karthik where forgives Naga. Karthik and Ramya resume their relationship. Meanwhile, Kashi and Babu are arrested by the inspector for drug smuggling, but gets released after Kashi manages to blackmail him by uploading a video, in which he was in company of a sex worker.

Meanwhile, Dheena, along with another smuggler Perumal and the Inspector kidnaps Babu and tells Kashi to hand over the bag to a secluded place where he replaces the cocaine bag with Rangoli Powder. Kashi finds Babu, who dies in his arms. Enraged, Kashi kills the inspector and flees with the bag. Meanwhile Perumal and Dheena catches up to him, where they stab him to death, but Kashi throws the bag somewhere, which is found by Karthik. Perumal double-crosses Dheena by giving him a fake bike number and meets up with Karthik, where he promises to give him ₹20 Lakhs in exchange for the bag, to which he and Giri agree. Karthik returns home, only to find his parents had unknowingly consumed cocaine, which they thought was a Chapathi Maida where they take them to the hospital where Kashi is also admitted. Kashi learns about Perumal's deal about the bag, after listening to the conversation between Karthik and Giri, believing that Karthik has the bag. He kidnaps Naga. Karthik, while finding the bag gives a lift to Dheena's henchman where Dheena learns about Perumal's betrayal. Perumal tries to kidnap Ramya, in order for Karthik to hand over the bag. Kashi arrives in nick of time and savagely kills Perumal and his gang, but Ramya escapes with Giri (who was knocked out by Kashi before, when Karthik went to meet Ramya to clear the misunderstanding).

Karthik lands in trouble due to Kashi's murders and an arrest warrant is issued on him. Karthik manages to save Naga, with Ramya's help. It is revealed that Karthik's office manager Sadhu had stolen the bag in order to take revenge on Karthik when he humiliated him in front of everyone. Karthik lies to Dheena that Councilor has the bag, where they meet up in the Councilor's godown. Dheena kills the Councilor, after he refuse to give them the bag, but Karthik's lie gets exposed and Sadhu unknowingly calls Dheena to set up a deal for the bag, where he is mistaken for Karthik's boss and is held captive. Karthik tries to snatch the bag, but Kashi arrives and fights with Dheena's henchman and also kills Dheena, avenging Babu's death, but gets stabbed and left to die, before the Councilor's godown is set ablazed. Karthik gets back Sundar's daughter's Jewellary case back and also becomes ACP, in efforts for thwarthing the drug syndicate. Karthik and Ramya get married with the blessings of his parents. After their marriage, Karthik gets a call from Kashi, who survived and congratulates him for becoming ACP. Karthik challenges Kashi that he will catch him red-handed, to which Kashi wishes him luck.

Cast
 Ganesh as Karthik / 'King' Kashi (Dual roles)
 Remya Nambeesan as Ramya
 Rangayana Raghu as Naga
 Sadhu Kokila as Sadhu
 Padmaja Rao
 Renny as Vishu 
 Mithra
 Sundar Raj
 Sadguna Murthy
 Rajashekar Naidu

Production
PC Shekhar who had worked with Ganesh before in Romeo, initially titled the film as King. However, upon Ganesh's suggestions, he added the word "Style" to the title. The official launch took place at the Symphony theatre in Bangalore on 7 August 2014. Malayalam actress Ramya Nambeesan was roped in to play the female lead. For the supporting roles, Rangayana Raghu was roped in and for the antagonist role, Rajendran joined the team.

Soundtrack
The film's score and soundtrack are composed by Arjun Janya. The audio is slated to release in November 2015.

References

External links
 
 Official facebook page

2016 films
Films about organised crime in India
Films scored by Arjun Janya
2010s Kannada-language films